One Nation Under CCTV was a 2007 mural by graffiti artist Banksy on Newman Street in London. Painted on the wall of a building used by the Royal Mail, it depicts a child in a red hooded top painting the phrase, while being watched by a police officer and a dog. The mural was situated adjacent to a CCTV camera. In 2008, the Westminster City Council ordered the work's removal on the grounds that it was an unlicensed commercial. The mural was painted over in April 2009.

See also
 List of public art formerly in London
 Works by Banksy that have been damaged or destroyed

References

External links
 
 One Nation Under CCTV 360° Panorama

2000s murals
2008 paintings
Murals in London
Works by Banksy